Gary "The Kid" Jacobs (born 10 December 1965) is a former professional Scottish boxer.

Jacobs at various points in his career held the British, Commonwealth, and  European (EBU) welterweight titles, as well as unsuccessfully challenging Pernell Whitaker for his WBC crown.  Jacobs wore a Star of David on his trunks.  He was inducted into the Scottish Boxing Hall of Fame in 2011.

Jacobs is now a professional boxing coach at the MTK Scotland Gym and lives in the suburbs of Glasgow with his wife and three children

See also
 List of British welterweight boxing champions
List of select Jewish boxers

References

External links

|-

1965 births
Living people
Boxers from Glasgow
Scottish male boxers
Scottish Jews
Jewish boxers
Jewish British sportspeople
Welterweight boxers